Events from the year 1417 in Ireland.

Incumbent
Lord: Henry V

Deaths

Art Mór Mac Murchadha Caomhánach (anglicized Art MacMurrough-Kavanagh), King of Leinster

References

 
Years of the 15th century in Ireland
Ireland
1410s in Ireland